Michael W. Mulholland, MD, Ph.D. is a Professor of Surgery and the Chairman of the Department of Surgery at the University of Michigan.

Biography 
Mulholland was educated at Northwestern University in Evanston, Illinois and gained his medical degree from Northwestern University Medical School in Chicago. This was followed by postgraduate training in General Surgery at the University of Minnesota in Minneapolis, where he also gained his Ph.D. From 1985-1988, Mulholland was an Assistant Professor of Surgery at the University of Washington in Seattle. He joined the faculty at the University of Michigan in 1988. Dr. Mulholland is now the Frederick A. Coller Distinguished Professor of Surgery, and Chair, Department of Surgery
 
Mulholland's area of specialization is in laparoscopic surgery and surgical endoscopy, including the treatment of pancreatic and biliary cancer, neoplastic diseases of the gastrointestinal tract, biliary reconstruction and inflammatory bowel disease. His research interests include the neurocrine control of pancreatic exocrine secretion and enteric neurobiology.

Mulholland has co-authored or edited several books and was elected as a member of the National Academy of Sciences in 2004.

Bibliography 
Essentials of Surgery: Scientific Principles and Practice
Surgery: Scientific Principles & Practice + Review for Surgery
Digestive Tract Surgery: A Text and Atlas
Greenfield's Surgery: Scientific Principles And Practice
Complications in Surgery

References 

American surgeons
Feinberg School of Medicine alumni
University of Minnesota alumni
Living people
Members of the United States National Academy of Sciences
University of Michigan faculty
Year of birth missing (living people)
Members of the National Academy of Medicine